SAAP may refer to:

 Supported Accommodation Assistance Program (SAAP)
 General Justo José de Urquiza Airport
 Service as a product
 Society for the Advancement of American Philosophy - see American philosophy
 Software as a Platform - see Computing platform
 Software as a Product - see Software product management
 Sean's Accepted Accounting Principles - see GAAP
 Selective aortic arch perfusion